Leslie Herbert Wexner (born September 8, 1937) is an American billionaire businessman, the founder and chairman emeritus of Bath & Body Works, Inc. (formerly Limited Brands). Wexner grew a business empire after starting The Limited, a clothing retailer with a restricted selection of profitable items, and later expanded his holdings to include Victoria's Secret, Abercrombie & Fitch, Express, Inc., and Bath & Body Works.

In February 2020, Wexner announced that he was transitioning from CEO of L Brands into the role of chairman emeritus.

Wexner hired Jeffrey Epstein as his financial manager beginning sometime in the 1980s and continuing until 2007. Wexner had a very close relationship with Epstein that began in the 1980s and continued until Epstein's death. Wexner was once the “main client” of Epstein’s money-management firm, according to Bloomberg. Wexner allowed Epstein to run his business out of a house he owned and resided in whilst CEO of Victoria's Secret.

Early life and education
Leslie Wexner was born in Dayton, Ohio, on September 8, 1937, to parents Bella (née Cabakoff 1908–2001) and Harry Louis Wexner (1899–1975). His parents were both of Russian-Jewish origin. His father was born in Russia. His mother, a first generation American, was born in the Williamsburg neighborhood of Brooklyn and moved to Columbus, Ohio, as a toddler. He has a younger sister, Susan. Wexner attended Bexley High School. He attended Ohio State University, and although he had expressed an interest in architecture he graduated in 1959 with a major in business administration. While at Ohio State University, he became a member of Sigma Alpha Mu fraternity. Wexner served in the Air National Guard. He briefly attended the Moritz College of Law.

Career
Wexner began his retail career working in his parents' clothing store "Leslie's", which had been named in his honor. After he decided to leave law school, his parents asked him to take care of the store when they went on their first vacation in ten years. While they were away on vacation, he analyzed the profit and loss margins on the women's clothing they sold. He found that although higher-priced clothing (e.g. jackets) had a higher margin per item, they sold less frequently than blouses and were therefore less profitable as a line. When he told his father this, his father was uninterested in changing his inventory.
 
In 1963, Wexner was lent $5,000 from his aunt Ida, which was then matched by a bank in order to start The Limited. The store took its name due to its limited focus on moderately priced merchandise, such as skirts, sweaters and shirts, that turned over quickly and generated greater revenues. Wexner opened the first store on August 10, 1963, in the Kingsdale Shopping Center in Upper Arlington, Ohio, a suburb of Columbus. One year later, Wexner's parents closed their store and joined their son in running The Limited. He opened the second Limited store in August 1964. He took Limited Brands public in 1969, listed as LTD on the NYSE.

A. Alfred Taubman reportedly served as a mentor for Wexner, starting in the mid 1960s, and the two partnered on many deals involving Taubman's shopping malls over the years.

Wexner expanded the Limited considerably in the 1970s, having opened the 100th store in 1976. He took on significant debt in 1978 to purchase the importer and manufacturer Mast Industries, which later was regarded to have provided him with essential business advantages over competitors.

In the 1980s, Wexner doubled his retail holdings by purchasing a number of companies and became known as a major retail owner at malls in America.

In 1982, Wexner acquired the lingerie business Victoria's Secret. Started as an MBA project by Stanford graduate Roy Raymond, Victoria's Secret attracted Wexner's interest due to the unique, high quality merchandise and Victorian-era decor of the shop which featured red-velvet sofas. Wexner described Raymond as "very guarded", stating, "When I met him, it was as if he met the devil." Six months later, when Raymond was facing bankruptcy, he contacted Wexner and offered to sell Victoria's Secret. Wexner bought the company for $1 million and by the 1990s it was worth an estimated $1 billion. After Wexner assumed ownership, Victoria's Secret became widely known for marketing its items with the use of super models known as "angels" which were featured in an annual fashion show, overseen by Ed Razek. By 2015, sales were in decline and 2018 proved to be the final year for the Victoria's Secret Fashion Show.

In 1993, he hired Len Schlesinger, a Harvard Business School professor, whom he later appointed a company director, to advise him.

Over the years, Wexner built a retailing and marketing conglomerate that included Victoria's Secret, Pink (Victoria's Secret for teens), Bath & Body Works, Henri Bendel, The White Barn Candle Company, and La Senza. Previous brands that were spun off include Lane Bryant, Abercrombie & Fitch, Lerner New York, The Limited Too (now Tween Brands, Inc.), Structure 9, Aura Science, The Limited (which closed its brick-and-mortar stores while retaining its online presence), and Express (which closed its Canadian stores and hundreds of its U.S.-based stores).

In 2012, CNN Money described Wexner as the longest serving CEO of a Fortune 500 company. In February 2020, Wexner was described as the longest serving CEO of a Fortune 500 company, with his 57 years at the helm of L Brands. He was on Harvard Business Review’s Top 100 Best Performing CEOs, ranked #11 in 2015, and #34 in 2016.

L Brands shareholders filed a complaint in the Court of Chancery of Delaware on January 14, 2021, stating that Wexner, among others, created an "entrenched culture of misogyny, bullying and harassment", and was aware of abuses being committed by Jeffrey Epstein, which breached his fiduciary duty to the company, causing devaluation of the brand. The complaint also names Wexner's wife, current chair Sarah E. Nash, and former marketing officer Ed Razek, whose "widely known misconduct" was long allowed at the company.

Wexner was called out in the pop song "Victoria's Secret", for profiting off women and contributing to their toxic body ideals. When Jax sings that "I know Victoria’s secret, and girl, you wouldn’t believe. She’s an old man who lives in Ohio making money off of girls like me.” she refers to Wexner. Wexner had developed the “perfect body” campaign for the brand.

Jeffrey Epstein association
Wexner hired Jeffrey Epstein as his financial manager beginning sometime in the 1980s and continuing until 2007. He was the primary billionaire client of Epstein, a financier who claimed to only work with clients with a net worth of one billion USD or greater. Epstein became Wexner's financial manager in 1987. Wexner purchased the New York property, the Herbert N. Straus House, in 1989 and later sold it to Epstein in the mid-1990s following his marriage to Abigail. In July 1991, Wexner granted Epstein power of attorney and also instated him as a trustee on the board of the Wexner Foundation.

Wexner has been accused of failing to take action when complaints were raised against Epstein, including after executives of L Brands reported (in the mid-1990s) that Epstein was abusing his power and connection to Wexner by posing as a recruiter of Victoria's Secret models. The artist Maria Farmer contacted local and federal authorities about an assault she allegedly endured by Epstein and Ghislaine Maxwell while working as an artist-in-residence on Wexner's Ohio property in 1996. Within a year of Farmer's complaint, the actress Alicia Arden filed a police report in Los Angeles detailing that Epstein had misrepresented himself as a recruiter for Victoria's Secret prior to another alleged assault.

In early 2006, Epstein was charged in Florida with "multiple counts of molestation and unlawful sexual activity with a minor." The New York Times reported that it was 18 months after the charges were raised that Wexner cut his ties to Epstein.

In August 2019, following Epstein's second incarceration and prior to his death, Wexner addressed the Wexner Foundation in writing, releasing a statement that his former financial advisor, Jeffrey Epstein, had “misappropriated vast sums of money” from him and from his family. Wexner retained services of criminal defense attorney Mary Jo White of Debevoise & Plimpton.
Wexner faced additional public scrutiny in late 2019 (and again in early 2020) when a group of wrestlers who are survivors of the Ohio State University abuse scandal publicly called on state and federal officials to conduct further inquiry into Maria Farmer's allegations of sexual assault at the Wexner property. The wrestlers called for accountability surrounding the Wexner family's involvement in Epstein's abuse and raised the issue of the continuing influence of Abigail and Leslie Wexner serving as the "biggest and best-known benefactors" of the university.

Wexner's relationship with Epstein was one of the subjects of the 2022 Hulu documentary Victoria's Secret: Angels and Demons.

Philanthropy
In 1989, Wexner and his mother Bella were the first to make a $1 million personal donation to the United Way. Both of their names were inscribed in marble and are on display in the lobby of the United Way Headquarters in Alexandria, Virginia.

Wexner was listed by Forbes in 2017, the wealthiest of seven billionaires from Ohio who made the list. He was a major funder of the Wexner Center for the Arts at the Ohio State University, which is named in honor of his father.

Wexner explained that because "growing up, my folks moved around a lot, and I never got a good Jewish education", he felt unprepared to take leadership roles in the Jewish community. So, in 1985, he joined Rabbi Herbert A. Friedman to establish the Wexner Foundation's first core program, aimed "to educate Jewish communal leaders in the history, thought, traditions and contemporary challenges of the Jewish people."

In 1991, Wexner formed with billionaire Charles Bronfman the Study Group, which is more widely known as the Mega Group. The group was a loosely organized club of some of the country's wealthiest and most influential businessmen who were concerned with Jewish issues. Max Fischer, Michael Steinhardt, Leonard Abramson, Edgar Bronfman, and Laurence Tisch were some of the members. The group would meet twice a year for two days of seminars related to the topic of philanthropy and Jewishness. In 1998, Steven Spielberg spoke about his personal religious journey, and later the group discussed Jewish summer camps. The group, which Wexner co-chaired with Charles Bronfman, went on to inspire a number of philanthropic initiatives such as the Partnership for Excellence in Jewish Education, Birthright Israel, and the upgrading of national Hillel.

Wexner served on the board of trustees of Ohio State University from 1988 to 1997. In December 2005, Wexner was appointed to his second term and was elected chairman in 2009. It was announced in June 2012 that Wexner's chairmanship was to end, eight years before his appointment would have ended.

On May 11, 2004, Wexner received the Woodrow Wilson Award for Corporate Citizenship at a dinner in Columbus, Ohio. The award was presented by the Woodrow Wilson International Center for Scholars of the Smithsonian Institution in Washington, DC.

On February 16, 2011, Wexner pledged a donation of $100 million to Ohio State, which will be allocated to the university’s academic Medical Center and James Cancer Hospital and Solove Research Institute, with additional gifts to the Wexner Center for the Arts and other areas. This latest gift is the largest in the university’s history.

Through the L Brands Foundation, Wexner and L Brands contributed $163.4 million to the Columbus Foundation.

On February 10, 2012, Ohio State University Medical Center officially changed its name to the Wexner Medical Center at Ohio State University commemorating "Mr. Wexner's indelible, lifelong legacy of leadership at Ohio State", according to university president E. Gordon Gee, during over 30 years of "ardent support" of the institution.

Personal life
On January 23, 1993, Wexner, then 55 years of age, married Abigail S. Koppel, 31, an attorney, in a ceremony at their home in New Albany, Ohio. The couple have four children.

Formerly of the Bexley area near Columbus, Ohio, Wexner now lives in New Albany, a community northeast of that city. The estate was, for twenty years, the location of the Annual New Albany Classic Invitational Grand Prix & Family Day benefiting The Center for Family Safety and Healing. In February 2018, Abigail Wexner announced the end of the event, citing the growing number of elite equestrian competitions.

Wexner has owned the mid-eighteenth century Foxcote House in Warwickshire, England, since 1997.

President George W. Bush appointed Wexner to serve in the Honorary Delegation to accompany him to Jerusalem for the celebration of the 60th anniversary of the State of Israel in May 2008.

Wexner was inducted as an honorary member into the 104th Class of Sphinx Senior Class Honorary at The Ohio State University on May 7, 2010.

On February 10, 2012, The Ohio State University board of trustees voted to rename The Ohio State University Medical Center in honor of Wexner. Now the medical center is known as Wexner Medical Center at Ohio State University.

Political activities
Wexner hosted a fundraiser in 2012 for Mitt Romney and donated $250,000 to Restore Our Future, Romney's super PAC. In 2015, Wexner donated $500,000 to the Right to Rise USA Super-Pac that supported the 2016 presidential campaign of Jeb Bush.

The Columbus Dispatch reported on September 14, 2018, that Wexner had renounced his affiliation with the Republican Party due to changes in its nature. Wexner made his comment shortly after former President Barack Obama gave a speech on the same Columbus Partnership panel that Wexner addressed.

See also
List of billionaires

References

Further reading

External links

The Wexner Foundation

 
1937 births
Living people
American billionaires
American chief executives of Fortune 500 companies
American fashion businesspeople
American people of Russian-Jewish descent
American political fundraisers
Bexley High School alumni
Jewish American philanthropists
Ohio State University Fisher College of Business alumni
Ohio State University trustees
People from Bexley, Ohio
Businesspeople from Dayton, Ohio
People from New Albany, Ohio
Ohio Republicans
Ohio Independents
21st-century American Jews
Jeffrey Epstein